Dasht Halqeh (also Romanized as Dasht Ḩalqeh; also known as Dasht Algheh) is a village in Chehel Chay Rural District, in the Central District of Minudasht County, Golestan Province, Iran. At the 2006 census, its population was 700, in 148 families.

References 

Populated places in Minudasht County